Gymnophthalmus marconaterai is a species of lizard in the family Gymnophthalmidae. It is endemic to Venezuela.

References

Gymnophthalmus
Reptiles of Venezuela
Endemic fauna of Venezuela
Reptiles described in 2017
Taxa named by Juan Elías García-Pérez
Taxa named by Walter E. Schargel